The Critics' Choice Television Award for Best Reality Series is one of the award categories presented annually by the Critics' Choice Television Awards (BTJA). It was introduced in 2011 when the event was first initiated. The winners are selected by a group of television critics that are part of the Broadcast Television Critics Association.

Winners and nominees

2010s

Multiple nominations
3 nominations
Undercover Boss

2 nominations
Duck Dynasty
Hoarders
Pawn Stars
Sister Wives

See also
 Primetime Emmy Award for Outstanding Reality Program
 TCA Award for Outstanding Achievement in Reality Programming

References

Critics' Choice Television Awards